Robert John Wade (born January 25, 1975) is a former American football center. He was drafted by the Jacksonville Jaguars in the fifth round of the 1998 NFL Draft. He played college football at Marshall.

Wade has also played for the Tampa Bay Buccaneers in his career.

Wade is married to Natalie, who also attended Marshall University and was a Cheerleader.

Early years
While attending Harrisonburg High School in Harrisonburg, Virginia, Wade was a three-year letterman in both football and baseball. In football, he was a first-team All-District and a second-team All-State honoree.  In 2006, Harrisonburg High School named their weight room "The Wade Room", after him.

Wade attended Marshall University and started 2 years.

Professional career
Wade, a 12-year professional and perennial starter, split his time in the NFL between the Jacksonville Jaguars (1998–2002) and Tampa Bay Buccaneers (2003–2007). He started 88 games in the past six years, missing just eight games in 2004 due to a dislocated knee. During John Wade's NFL career he started a total of 110 games, including 6 playoff starts. On March 31, 2008, he signed with the Oakland Raiders.  Wade was released by the Raiders during the 2009 pre-season. They agreed to an injury settlement.

References

1975 births
Living people
American football centers
Jacksonville Jaguars players
Oakland Raiders players
Marshall Thundering Herd football players
Tampa Bay Buccaneers players
People from Harrisonburg, Virginia
Players of American football from Virginia
Ed Block Courage Award recipients